The Besnard Lakes Are the Dark Horse (sometimes referred to as ...Are the Dark Horse) is the second studio album by the Canadian rock band The Besnard Lakes, released in 2007 (see 2007 in music). The album was The Besnard Lakes' first release on indie label Jagjaguwar and was self-produced by bandleaders Jace Lasek and Olga Goreas. It was nominated for the 2007 Polaris Music Prize.

Track listing
All songs written by Olga Goreas, Jace Lasek, and Nicole Lizee.

Personnel

The Besnard Lakes
 Olga Goreas – vocals (except on "Disaster"), bass (except on "Disaster"), drums, organ, synthesizer, glockenspiel
 Jace Lasek – vocals (except on "Devastation"), guitar (except on "Devastation"), organ (on "For Agent 13", "And You Lied to Me", "Because Tonight", "Rides the Rails"), drums, piano, Rhodes, synthesizer, lap steel guitar, tambourine
 Kevin Laing – drums (on "And You Lied to Me", "Devastation", "Cedric's War")
 Nicole Lizée – string, horn, flute, and saxophone arrangements (on "Disaster", "Because Tonight", "Rides the Rails"), Rhodes (on "And You Lied to Me", "On Bedford and Grant"), bass, synthesizer
 Steve Raegele – vocals (on "Rides the Rails"), guitar (on "And You Lied to Me", "Devastation")

Additional personnel
 Heather Schnarr – violin (on "Disaster", "Because Tonight", "Rides the Rails")
Sophie Trudeau – violin (on "Disaster", "Rides the Rails")
Chris Seligman – French horn (on "Disaster", "Rides the Rails")
 Billy Boufford – flute (on "Disaster", "Rides the Rails"), soprano saxophone (on "Disaster", "Rides the Rails")
Jonathan Cummins – guitar (on "And You Lied to Me", "Devastation")
 Eric LaRock – bass (on "Devastation")
 Jerimiah Bullied – guitar (on "Devastation")
 George Donoso III – drums (on "Devastation")
 Jean-Paul Perron – drums (on "Devastation")
 The Fifth String Liberation Singers Choir – vocals (on "Devastation")

References

2007 albums
The Besnard Lakes albums
Outside Music albums